Illinois elected its member August 7, 1826.

See also 
 1826 and 1827 United States House of Representatives elections
 List of United States representatives from Illinois

1826
Illinois
United States House of Representatives